Gran Hermano Ecuador was the ecuadorian version of the reality show based on the international Big Brother format produced in the Netherlands by Endemol. Gran Hermano Ecuador was broadcast by Ecuavisa network and 24 hours a day by its paid television company Univisa obtainingn the highest ratings of the last years.

The reality show was filmed in the house of Gran Hermano Argentina owned by the televisión Network Telefe and it began on 16 March 2003 and finished on 13 July 2003 with a total duration of 120 days.

The winner of the first season was David Burbano, a 21-year-old student born in the city of Cuenca.

First season (2003)

Contestants

Nominations table
Housemates nominate for two points (top of the box) and one point (bottom of the box) and the two or more Housemates with the most nomination points face the public vote.

Notes

External links

Ecuador
Ecuadorian reality television series
2003 Ecuadorian television series debuts
2003 Ecuadorian television series endings
2000s Ecuadorian television series